The 2009 Big 12 Conference football season was the 14th season for the Big 12, as part of the 2009 NCAA Division I FBS football season.

Previous season

Preseason

Coaching changes

Spring games

Media Poll

Ranked by total points, first place votes shown in parentheses.

Watchlists

Rankings

All-Big 12 Teams & Awards

First Team

Offense
QB Colt McCoy – Texas
RB Daniel Thomas – Kansas State
RB Keith Toston – Oklahoma State
FB Bryant Ward – Oklahoma State
WR Jordan Shipley – Texas
WR Danario Alexander – Missouri
WR Dezmon Briscoe – Kansas
TE Jeron Mastrud – Kansas State
OL Russell Okung – Oklahoma State
OL Trent Williams – Oklahoma
OL Nick Stringer – Kansas State
OL Brandon Carter – Texas Tech
OL Nate Solder – Colorado
PK Grant Ressel – Missouri
KR/PR Brandon Banks – Kansas State

Defense
DL Ndamukong Suh      – Nebraska
DL Gerald McCoy       – Oklahoma
DL Von Miller         – Texas A&M
DL Brandon Sharpe     – Texas Tech
DL Jared Crick        – Nebraska
LB Sean Weatherspoon  – Missouri
LB Jesse Smith        – Iowa State
LB Travis Lewis       – Oklahoma
DB Earl Thomas        – Texas
DB Perrish Cox        – Oklahoma State
DB Dominique Franks   – Oklahoma
DB Prince Amukamara   – Nebraska
DB Larry Asante       – Nebraska
P  Derek Epperson     – Baylor

Second Team

Offense
QB  Jerrod Johnson  – Texas A&M
RB  Roy Helu Jr.  – Nebraska
RB  DeMarco Murray  – Oklahoma
FB  Jamie McCoy  – Texas A&M
WR  Ryan Broyles  – Oklahoma
WR  Kerry Meier  – Kansas
WR  Brandon Banks  – Kansas State
TE  Riar Geer  – Colorado
OL  J.D. Walton  – Baylor
OL  Chris Hall   – Texas
OL  Kurtis Gregory  – Missouri
OL  Adam Ulatoski  – Texas
OL  Brody Eldridge  – Oklahoma
OL  Lee Grimes  – Texas A&M
PK  Alex Henery  – Nebraska
KR/PR  Perrish Cox  – Oklahoma State

Defense
DL  Sergio Kindle     – Texas
DL  Lamarr Houston     – Texas
DL  Jeremy Beal      – Oklahoma
DL  Jaron Baston     – Missouri
DL  Daniel Howard     – Texas Tech
LB  Joe Pawelek     – Baylor
LB  Roddrick Muckelroy – Texas
LB  Phillip Dillard    – Nebraska
DB  Jamar Wall     – Texas Tech
DB  Quinton Carter     – Oklahoma
DB  Brian Jackson     – Oklahoma
DB  Jordan Lake     – Baylor
DB  Cha’pelle Brown    – Colorado
DB  Trent Hunter     – Texas A&M
P  Tress Way     – Oklahoma

Individual Awards

Coach of the Year:                 Mack Brown – Texas 
Offensive Lineman of the Year:     Russell Okung – Oklahoma State 
Defensive Lineman of the Year:     Ndamukong Suh –  Nebraska 
Offensive Freshman of the Year:    Christine Michael – Texas A&M 
Defensive Freshman of the Year:    Aldon Smith – Missouri 
Special Teams Player of the Year:  Brandon Banks – Kansas State 
Defensive Newcomer of the Year:    David Sims – Iowa State 
Offensive Newcomer of the Year:    Daniel Thomas – Kansas State 
Defensive Player of the Year:     Ndamukong Suh – Nebraska 
Offensive Player of the Year:     Colt McCoy – Texas

Conference statistical leaders

Records against other conferences

Bowl games

Attendance

References